The siege of León of 1368 was a successful siege of the city by the pretender Henry of Trastámara, in the course of the Castilian Civil War.

History

In 1367, Henry of Castile, resoundingly defeated in the Battle of Nájera, went back to the Peninsula leading an army and taking Burgos. After seizing the town of Dueñas and its castle in mid-January 1368, Henry headed for the city of León, one of the capitals of the kingdom. León had remained loyal to King Pedro of Castile, and received his favors. Therefore, the city presented a strong resistance for several months, until the besiegers succeeded in seizing the convent of Santo Domingo, near the walls, and placed there a siege tower. Given the inability to defend the city, its defenders decided to surrender.

Upon the surrender of the city of León to king Henry, the whole Kingdom of Galicia did the same, and took sides with Henry.

References

 LÓPEZ DE AYALA, Pedro: Crónica del rey don Pedro, año 1368, cap. 1.

1368 in Europe
Léon
14th century in Castile
1368